Tyra Collette is a character in the NBC/DirecTV drama Friday Night Lights, portrayed by actress Adrianne Palicki.

Character biography
Tyra is a resident of the fictional Dillon, Texas. She works at Applebee's and lives with her mother and older sister, who is a stripper. Little is known about her absent father. Initially the girlfriend of Tim Riggins, she spends most of the series actively hating Dillon, football, and the Dillon Panthers.

Season one
At the beginning of season one, Tyra is dating Tim Riggins despite publicly flirting with Brian "Smash" Williams. She eventually dumps Tim, but is still devastated when she learns he slept with his best friend's girlfriend, Lyla Garrity.

After witnessing her mother's abuse at the hands of her boyfriend, Tyra encourages her mother to get a job and become independent. She secures an interview for her mother through Tim Riggins, who calls in a favor with Buddy Garrity. However, her mother and Buddy begin an affair and her mother is let go from her job when Buddy decides to end the affair.

Tyra also strikes up a friendship with Julie Taylor. While the Taylors initially object to the friendship because Tyra's sister, Mindy, is a stripper and they fear Tyra is a bad influence, Tami Taylor changes her mind after she sees Tyra cleaning up after her drunk mother. Tami encourages Tyra to focus on school and getting into college.

Tyra is assaulted by a stranger while waiting to meet Landry Clarke to study. She asks Landry to keep the assault a secret, trying to minimize its severity. However, encouraged by Matt to tell someone, Landry goes to Tami Taylor, who in turn convinces Tyra to file a police report. She is severely shaken after the attempted rape and becomes much closer to Landry.

Season two
In season two, Tyra is stalked and attacked for a second time by the same man in season one. Landry kills her attempted rapist and the two dispose of the body together after first attempting to save him.  For a while, the two are constantly nervous and scared that the police will discover the body and they will go to jail. They begin a brief relationship, though Tyra eventually leaves him at the request of Landry's father, a town police officer, after the police decide not to bring charges against Landry. Tyra remains confused by the intensity of her feelings for Landry, keeping him at arm's length until another girl shows interest in him.

Season three
In season three, Tyra becomes dispirited after learning that despite the hard work she put into her last two years of school, her GPA is still too low to get her into most colleges. Tyra spends most of the season alternating between thinking that her situation is hopeless and trying hard to remain on top of her academic career. She eventually runs off for a few weeks with a cowboy named Cash. In Dallas, he turns abusive after she discovers he has a gambling problem.

After refocusing on her education, she is wait-listed at the University of Texas and is eventually offered a place there. She ends the season in a relationship with Landry after they reconnect after he helps her with her SATs. While thinking of what to write for her college essay, she confesses to Landry that she has been angry and bitter over her dysfunctional family life and "had enough hate in my heart to start a freaking car". Her perception changed after watching Jason Street, the Panthers' "All-American" golden boy who has everything Tyra does not – loving parents, close friends, and the chance to go to college – lose his dreams of playing college football in a single play and it makes her realize that life "isn't fair for anybody" regardless of background and status.

Season four
Tyra is absent from season 4, presumably spending her time at the University of Texas. She is mentioned by Landry briefly in one episode when she fails to meet him at their designated meeting spot, when he decides to completely give up on a relationship with her.

Season five
Tyra spends most of season 5 at the University of Texas, and returns to Dillon near the end of the season to help out Mindy and her mother with Stevie and the impending twins. She drops in on Tim unexpectedly who is now working at Buddy's, much to his delight. Toward the end of the season, she tells him that "she's been in love with him since they were five years old." Tim seems to acknowledge this, and it is plausible they end up back together. She also re-connects with Julie and celebrates Julie and Matt Saracen's engagement with Tim.

References

Friday Night Lights (TV series) characters
Fictional waiting staff
Fictional characters from Texas
Television characters introduced in 2006